Mehranjan or Mehrenjan may refer to:
 Mehrenjan, Kazerun, Fars Province
 Mehrenjan, Mamasani, Fars Province
 Mehranjan-e Arameneh, Isfahan Province
 Mehrenjan-e Otrak, Isfahan Province